Kakinada Port is located at Kakinada off the east coast of India.

Kakinada Port is a large complex comprising Kakinada Anchorage Port, Kakinada Deep Water Port, Kakinada Fishing Harbour and Ship-Breaking Unit. Kakinada Anchorage Port has a century-long tradition.

The port can handle vessels up to 50,000 DWT. The port handled 10.81 million tonnes of cargo in 2010–2011. The AP Govt developed Kakinada beach in 2013 and it has 100 acres of land covered from port to uppada area.

Kakinada Port railway station was opened in 2011.

See also 

 Kakinada City
 Hope Island

References 

Ports and harbours of Andhra Pradesh
Transport in Kakinada
Transport in East Godavari district
Proposed infrastructure in Andhra Pradesh
Year of establishment missing